South Houston is a city in the U.S. state of Texas, within Houston–The Woodlands–Sugar Land metropolitan area and Harris County. The population was 16,153 at the 2020 census. It is bordered by the cities of Houston and Pasadena, and geographically located southeast of Houston.

History

C.S. Woods of the Western Land Company founded the settlement of Dumont in 1907. A post office appeared in 1910. In 1913 Dumont was incorporated as the city of South Houston. Because of the 1913 incorporation, Houston did not incorporate South Houston's territory into its city limits, while Houston annexed surrounding areas that were unincorporated. South Houston's initial industrial activity consisted of shipping produce along the Galveston, Houston and Henderson Railroad. The hurricane of 1915 destroyed many of the local industries. The establishment of the Houston Ship Channel resulted in the establishment of manufacturing industries inland, including in South Houston. Between the 1940s and the early 1960s South Houston found rapid population growth. The city had 7,523 inhabitants in 1960. In 1980, South Houston had 11,782 inhabitants and 303 businesses. In 1990, 14,207 inhabitants lived in South Houston.

Elephants belonging to former South Houston mayor George Christy, a circus owner, assisted the construction of the Spencer Highway.

From the 1980 census to the 1990 census, Hispanics began to move into South Houston by an amount between 1,000 and 3,500 per square mile. Most Hispanics in South Houston were of Mexican descent.

Geography

South Houston is located at  (29.660980, –95.229787).

According to the United States Census Bureau, the city has a total area of 7.8 km2, none of which is covered with water.

Demographics

As of the 2020 United States census, there were 16,153 people, 5,221 households, and 4,107 families residing in the city.

As of the census of 2010, there were 16,983 people from 4,617 households residing in the city. The racial makeup of the city was 1.1% White, 1.2% African American, 0.80% Native American, 0.70% Asian, 0.00% Pacific Islander, 1.74% from other races, and 2.6% from two or more races. Hispanic or Latino of any race were 89.4% of the population.

There were 4,593 households, out of which 47.7% had children under the age of 18 living with them, 60.1% were married couples living together, 13.9% had a female householder with no husband present, and 19.5% were non-families. 15.4% of all households were made up of individuals, and 5.4% had someone living alone who was 65 years of age or older. The average household size was 3.45 and the average family size was 3.86.

In the city, the population was spread out, with 34.1% under the age of 18, 11.7% from 18 to 24, 30.8% from 25 to 44, 16.5% from 45 to 64, and 6.8% who were 65 years of age or older. The median age was 28 years. For every 100 females, there were 104.1 males. For every 100 females age 18 and over, there were 103.6 males.

The median income for a household in the city was $44,607 [in 2017 dollars]. The per capita income for the city was $15,611. About 24% of the population was below the poverty line, including 25.8% of those under age 18 and 10.5% of those age 65 or over.

Government and infrastructure

Local government

The South Houston City Council establishes city policies, considering resolutions and ordinances, appointing South Houston residents to positions on municipal committees and boards, and establishing the annual budgets. City council meets during the first and third Tuesdays of each month in the South Houston Municipal Court; meetings begin at 7:30 PM; it is open to members of the public. As of 2008 the mayor is Joe Soto. The council members are Irene Tamayo, Bill Kelly, Albert Hernandez, Robert Garcia, and Amy Burnett.

The South Houston Fire Department serves the city. The South Houston Police Department is headquartered at 1023 West Dallas Street. As of 2008 Herbert Gilbert is the chief of police.

County, state, and federal representation
South Houston is located within Harris County Commissioner Precinct 2; as of 2020 Adrian Garcia heads Precinct 2.

South Houston is located in District 145 of the Texas House of Representatives. As of 2008 Rick Noriega represents the district. South Houston is within District 6 of the Texas Senate; as of 2008 Mario Gallegos is the representative.

South Houston is within Texas's 29th congressional district; as of 2019. Sylvia Garcia is the representative. The United States Postal Service operates the South Houston Post Office at 315 North Allen Genoa Road.

The nearest public health center of the Harris Health System (formerly Harris County Health System) is Strawberry Health Clinic in Pasadena. The nearest public hospital is Ben Taub General Hospital in the Texas Medical Center, Houston.

Economy
The Lewis Food Town grocery store chain is based in South Houston.

In 2006 H-E-B opened the "Mi Tienda" ("My Store") Hispanic-themed store in South Houston. As of 2007 all of its employees spoke Spanish.

Education

Primary and secondary schools

Public schools

South Houston is served by the Pasadena Independent School District.

The following elementary schools serve sections of South Houston:
 Pearl Hall Elementary School (South Houston)
 Walter Matthys Elementary School (South Houston)
 It opened in August 1992.  it had 775 students.
 L.F. Smith Elementary School (South Houston)
 South Houston Elementary School (South Houston)
As of 2000 South Houston Elementary had computers and computer equipment in all of its classrooms as well as a broadcasting studio operated by students. In the period 1999–2000 South Houston Elementary, despite the low socio-economic backgrounds of its students, received "recognized" scores from the Texas Education Agency.

Sections of South Houston west of Old Galveston Road are served by Rick Schneider Middle School (Houston, Grades 5–6). Parts of South Houston are zoned to Carter Lomax Middle School (Pasadena, Grades 5–6). Parts of South Houston are not served by any "middle school" and instead are served by elementary schools, intermediate schools, and high schools.

Sections of South Houston west of Old Galveston Road are served by South Houston Intermediate School (South Houston, Grades 7–8). Parts east of Old Galveston Road are served by Queens Intermediate School (Pasadena, Grades 6–8). South Houston Intermediate opened on property acquired by PISD in 1947; it previously housed the Asgard College for Girls, a prison for delinquent boys, a psychiatric hospital, a transit house for the federal government, and a National Youth Association Camp.

All of South Houston is served by South Houston High School.

Public libraries

South Houston is served by the South Houston Branch of Harris County Public Library at 607 Avenue A. The first South Houston library opened in 1927. In 1937 money was raised to build a structure to house the library; this structure stands in a park next to the current library. In the 1950s the library moved into a building with a welfare office and a clinic. In 1967 the city purchased land and a barracks building from Ellington Field; the city then moved the library there, where it remained until 1991. The current  branch opened in May 1991.

Colleges and universities

Residents of Pasadena ISD (and therefore South Houston) are zoned to San Jacinto College.

Gallery of schools

Transportation
Harris County Transit doesn't serve South Houston.

Gallery

Notes

References

Further reading
A Short History of South Houston (South Houston Chamber of Commerce, 1982).
News Citizen (Pasadena, Texas), April 9, 1970.

External links

City of South Houston official website
South Houston Chamber of Congress
South Houston Police Department (Archive)
South Houston High School

Cities in Harris County, Texas
Cities in Texas
Greater Houston